Türkan is a settlement and municipality in Baku, Azerbaijan.

Türkan may also refer to:
 Turkan, the land of the Turkana people

People with the given name
 Türkân Akyol (1928–2017), Turkish politician and former government minister
 Türkan Erişmiş (born 1984), Turkish middle distance runner
 Türkan Feyzullah (1983–1984), female murder victim
 Türkan Haliloğlu, Turkish biochemist
 Türkan Örs Baştuğ (1900–1975), Turkish school teacher, politician and one of the first (1915–2007), first ever Turkish professor of jurisprudence female members of the parliament
 Türkan Rado (1915–2007), first ever Turkish female professor of jurisprudence
 Türkan Saylan (1935–2009), Turkish physician
 Türkan Şoray (born 1945), Turkish film actress

See also
 Torkan (disambiguation)
 Turkan (disambiguation)